Linwood is a city in Atlantic County, in the U.S. state of New Jersey. As of the 2020 United States census, the city's population was 6,971, a decrease of 121 (−1.7%) from the 2010 census count of 7,092, which in turn reflected a decline of 80 (−1.1%) from the 7,172 counted in the 2000 census.

Linwood was originally incorporated as a borough by an act of the New Jersey Legislature on February 20, 1889, from portions of Egg Harbor Township, based on the results of a referendum held the previous day. Linwood was reincorporated as a city on April 27, 1931. The area had been called Leedsville until 1880, when a post office was being established. The United States Postal Service insisted that the name had to be changed as it conflicted with an existing post office elsewhere in the state. Among the names proposed and considered by local residents were "Brinola", "Geneva", "Pearville" and "Viola", with "Linwood" ultimately chosen.

Geography
According to the United States Census Bureau, the city had a total area of 4.21 square miles (10.91 km2), including 3.81 square miles (9.87 km2) of land and 0.40 square miles (1.04 km2) of water (9.55%).

It borders the municipalities of Egg Harbor Township, Northfield and Somers Point.

Unincorporated communities, localities and place names located partially or completely within the city include Bellhaven and Seaview.

Demographics

The median house value in 2005 was $300,200.

2010 census

The Census Bureau's 2006–2010 American Community Survey showed that (in 2010 inflation-adjusted dollars) median household income was $80,518 (with a margin of error of +/− $8,965) and the median family income was $103,529 (+/− $11,162). Males had a median income of $90,125 (+/− $16,766) versus $50,125 (+/− $5,378) for females. The per capita income for the city was $47,501 (+/− $5,093). About 2.1% of families and 2.8% of the population were below the poverty line, including 3.2% of those under age 18 and 7.9% of those age 65 or over.

2000 census
As of the 2000 United States census there were 7,172 people, 2,647 households, and 1,966 families residing in the city. The racial makeup of the city was 95.20% White, 1.06% African American, 0.11% Native American, 2.41% Asian, 0.22% from other races, and 0.99% from two or more races. Hispanic or Latino of any race were 1.81% of the population.

There were 2,647 households, out of which 35.1% had children under the age of 18 living with them, 63.4% were married couples living together, 8.5% had a female householder with no husband present, and 25.7% were non-families. 22.3% of all households were made up of individuals, and 12.9% had someone living alone who was 65 years of age or older. The average household size was 2.65 and the average family size was 3.13.

In the city the population was spread out, with 26.2% under the age of 18, 3.8% from 18 to 24, 24.3% from 25 to 44, 27.0% from 45 to 64, and 18.8% who were 65 years of age or older. The median age was 43 years. For every 100 females, there were 87.3 males. For every 100 females age 18 and over, there were 83.6 males.

The median income for a household in the city was $60,000, and the median income for a family was $71,415. Males had a median income of $51,614 versus $31,627 for females. The per capita income for the city was $32,159. About 3.8% of families and 3.9% of the population were below the poverty line, including 2.1% of those under age 18 and 7.5% of those age 65 or over.

Government

Local government
Linwood operates under the City form of New Jersey municipal government, one of 15 (of the 564) municipalities statewide that use this form. The governing body is comprised of a Mayor and a seven-member City Council who are chosen in partisan balloting held as part of the November general election. The mayor is elected at-large for a four-year term of office. On the city council, six council members are elected from the city's two wards for three-year terms on a staggered basis with two ward seats coming up for election each year, and one at-large council member is elected for a three-year term. The council exercises the legislative power of the city by adopting ordinances and resolutions. In addition, the council is responsible for the approval of the city budget, the establishment of financial controls and setting of all salaries of elected and appointed officers and employees. An administrator is charged with directing the day-to-day activities of city government.

, the Mayor of the City of Linwood is Republican Darren H. Matik, whose term of office ends December 31, 2023. The City Council is comprised of Blair Albright (R, 2024, Ward 2), June Byrnes (R, 2024; Ward 1), Stacy DeDomenicis (R, 2022; Ward 1), Eric Ford (R, 2023; Ward 1), Matthew B. Levinson (R, 2024, At Large), Todd Michael (R, 2022, Ward 2; elected to serve an unexpired term) and Ralph A. Paolone (R, 2023; Ward 2).

Todd Michael was appointed in June 2021 to fill the Ward 2 seat expiring in December 2022 that had been hele by Brian Heun until he resigned from office the previous March. Michael served on an interim basis until he won election for the balance of the term of office in November 2021.

In January 2020, Matthew B. Levinson was appointed to fill the at-large city council seat expiring in December 2020 that was vacated by Darren H. Matik when he took office as mayor.

In May 2016, Eric Ford was selected from three candidates nominated by the Republican municipal committee to fill the Ward 1 seat expiring in December 2017 that became vacant following the resignation of Timothy Tighe.

Darren Matik was named in August 2012 to fill the vacant at-large seat that had been held by Matthew Levinson, who resigned the previous month. Todd Gordon was appointed in January 2013 to fill the seat of Alex Marino, who had resigned following his taking office on the Atlantic County Board of Chosen Freeholders. Brian Heun was appointed in February 2014 to fill the unexpired term of Donna Taylor.

Federal, state and county representation
Linwood is located in the 2nd Congressional District and is part of New Jersey's 2nd state legislative district.

 

Atlantic County is governed by a directly elected county executive and a nine-member Board of County Commissioners, responsible for legislation. The executive serves a four-year term and the commissioners are elected to staggered three-year terms, of which four are elected from the county on an at-large basis and five of the commissioners represent equally populated districts. , Atlantic County's Executive is Republican Dennis Levinson, whose term of office ends December 31, 2023. Members of the Board of County Commissioners are:

Ernest D. Coursey, District 1, including Atlantic City (part), Egg Harbor Township (part), and Pleasantville (D, 2022, Atlantic City), Chair Maureen Kern, District 2, including Atlantic City (part), Egg Harbor Township (part), Linwood, Longport, Margate City, Northfield, Somers Point and Ventnor City (R, 2024, Somers Point), Andrew Parker III, District 3, including Egg Harbor Township (part) and Hamilton Township (part) (R, Egg Harbor Township, 2023), Richard R. Dase, District 4, including Absecon, Brigantine, Galloway Township and Port Republic (R, 2022, Galloway Township), James A. Bertino, District 5, including Buena, Buena Vista Township, Corbin City, Egg Harbor City, Estell Manor, Folsom, Hamilton Township (part), Hammonton, Mullica Township and Weymouth Township (R, 2018, Hammonton), Caren L. Fitzpatrick, At-Large (D, 2023, Linwood), Frank X. Balles, At-Large (R, Pleasantville, 2024) Amy L. Gatto, Freeholder (R, 2022, Hamilton Township) and Vice Chair John W. Risley, At-Large (R, 2023, Egg Harbor Township)

Atlantic County's constitutional officers are: 
County Clerk Joesph J. Giralo (R, 2026, Hammonton), 
Sheriff Eric Scheffler (D, 2024, Northfield) and 
Surrogate James Curcio (R, 2025, Hammonton).

Politics
As of March 2011, there were a total of 5,197 registered voters in Linwood City, of which 1,120 (21.6% vs. 30.5% countywide) were registered as Democrats, 1,894 (36.4% vs. 25.2%) were registered as Republicans and 2,181 (42.0% vs. 44.3%) were registered as Unaffiliated. There were 2 voters registered as either Libertarians or Greens. Among the city's 2010 Census population, 73.3% (vs. 58.8% in Atlantic County) were registered to vote, including 97.5% of those ages 18 and over (vs. 76.6% countywide).

In the 2012 presidential election, Republican Mitt Romney received 2,190 votes (57.0% vs. 41.1% countywide), ahead of Democrat Barack Obama with 1,592 votes (41.4% vs. 57.9%) and other candidates with 39 votes (1.0% vs. 0.9%), among the 3,842 ballots cast by the city's 5,408 registered voters, for a turnout of 71.0% (vs. 65.8% in Atlantic County). In the 2008 presidential election, Republican John McCain received 2,190 votes (53.0% vs. 41.6% countywide), ahead of Democrat Barack Obama with 1,851 votes (44.8% vs. 56.5%) and other candidates with 51 votes (1.2% vs. 1.1%), among the 4,131 ballots cast by the city's 5,476 registered voters, for a turnout of 75.4% (vs. 68.1% in Atlantic County). In the 2004 presidential election, Republican George W. Bush received 2,254 votes (56.3% vs. 46.2% countywide), ahead of Democrat John Kerry with 1,674 votes (41.8% vs. 52.0%) and other candidates with 40 votes (1.0% vs. 0.8%), among the 4,004 ballots cast by the city's 5,011 registered voters, for a turnout of 79.9% (vs. 69.8% in the whole county).

In the 2013 gubernatorial election, Republican Chris Christie received 1,800 votes (69.9% vs. 60.0% countywide), ahead of Democrat Barbara Buono with 679 votes (26.4% vs. 34.9%) and other candidates with 27 votes (1.0% vs. 1.3%), among the 2,576 ballots cast by the city's 5,541 registered voters, yielding a 46.5% turnout (vs. 41.5% in the county). In the 2009 gubernatorial election, Republican Chris Christie received 1,536 votes (55.4% vs. 47.7% countywide), ahead of Democrat Jon Corzine with 1,017 votes (36.7% vs. 44.5%), Independent Chris Daggett with 174 votes (6.3% vs. 4.8%) and other candidates with 30 votes (1.1% vs. 1.2%), among the 2,774 ballots cast by the city's 5,260 registered voters, yielding a 52.7% turnout (vs. 44.9% in the county).

Historic district

The Linwood Historic District is a  historic district within the city along Maple and Poplar avenues, and Shore Road. It was added to the National Register of Historic Places on July 13, 1989 for its significance in architecture and social history. The district includes 129 contributing buildings and three contributing sites.

The Masonic Temple was built  and features Doric columns. The district also includes Linwood Borough School No. 1, listed individually on the NRHP in 1984.

Education

Public schools
Students in pre-kindergarten through eighth grade are served by the Linwood Public Schools. As of the 2020–21 school year, the district, comprised of two schools, had an enrollment of 809 students and 71.0 classroom teachers (on an FTE basis), for a student–teacher ratio of 11.4:1. Schools in the district (with 2020–21 enrollment data from the National Center for Education Statistics) are 
Seaview Elementary School with 429 students in grades Pre-K–4 and 
Belhaven Middle School with 378 students in grades 5–8.

Students in public school for ninth through twelfth grades attend Mainland Regional High School, which also serves students from Northfield and Somers Point. The high school is located in Linwood. For the 1997–98 school year, Mainland Regional High School was recognized by the United States Department of Education as a National Blue Ribbon School. As of the 2020–21 school year, the high school had an enrollment of 1,239 students and 108.0 classroom teachers (on an FTE basis), for a student–teacher ratio of 11.5:1.

Borough public school students are also eligible to attend the Atlantic County Institute of Technology in the Mays Landing section of Hamilton Township or the Charter-Tech High School for the Performing Arts, located in Somers Point.

Private school
The Gospel of Grace Christian School serves students from pre-kindergarten through sixth grade.

Transportation

Roads and highways

Several major highways are accessible just outside the city, including the Garden State Parkway and the Atlantic City Expressway. These major highways provide connections to New York City, Philadelphia and Cape May.

Public transportation
NJ Transit offers bus transportation to and from Ocean City and Atlantic City on the 507 and 509 routes.

Community services
 There are only three traffic lights in the city: Central and Oak, Central and New Road, and Poplar and New Road.  An additional traffic light lies on the border with Somers Point, at Ocean Heights and New Road.
 There are at least three points of access to the waters surrounding Linwood. The west end of Hamilton Avenue abuts Patcong Creek, allowing the launching of canoes or kayaks (and possibly trailered boats). An unnamed dirt road (Poplar Docks) just to the east of the Linwood Country Club ends several hundred yards into the marshes, and it may allow launching of trailered boats at low tide (the end of the road tends to submerge at high tide). The eastern end of Seaview Avenue is a better-constructed dirt road that ends at a dock (known as "Seaview Docks" to locals) on Sod Thorofare, and is suitable for trailered boats. A parking permit is required at the Hamilton Avenue and Seaview Avenue sites. Permits are valid for the entire calendar year, though their purchase price varies with time of acquisition:
 January 1 through March 31: $20 per permit, except for senior citizens 65 years or older, where the fee will be $5 per permit.
 Permits purchased subsequent to March 31 and prior to Labor Day will be available at a cost of $50 per permit.
 Permits purchased from Labor Day through December 31 will be available at a cost of $20 per permit.
 Up to 450 permits per year are issued, and they can be purchased at the office of the City Clerk.
 On May 14, 2003, the City Council approved the auction of up to two licenses, citywide, for restaurant service of alcoholic beverages. Package-good sales are not permitted anywhere in the city. This was the first revision to the alcohol-sales-related section of the city code since 1969; it is unclear if sales were permitted prior to that year.

Notable people

People who were born in, residents of, or otherwise closely associated with Linwood include:

 James F. Allen (born 1960), chairman of Hard Rock International and chief executive officer of Seminole Gaming
 John F. Amodeo (born 1950), member of the New Jersey General Assembly from 2008 to 2014 who represented the 2nd Legislative District and had served on the Linwood City Council from 1998 to 2005
 Sarah Broadhead (1831–1910), author of The Diary of a Lady from Gettysburg, Pennsylvania, who became a resident of Linwood after 1885
 Greg Buttle (born 1954), former NFL linebacker for the New York Jets
 Mark H. Buzby (born 1956), former United States Navy rear admiral who serves as Administrator of the United States Maritime Administration
 Joshua Cohen (born 1980), novelist and story writer, best known for his works Witz (2010) and Book of Numbers (2015)
 Chris Daggett (born 1950), President and CEO of the Geraldine R. Dodge Foundation who ran as an independent candidate for Governor of New Jersey in the 2009 election
 Shereef Elnahal (born 1985), physician who has served as 21st Commissioner of the New Jersey Department of Health
 John F. Gaffney (1934–1995), politician who represented the 2nd Legislative District in the New Jersey General Assembly after serving as Mayor of Linwood from 1976 to 1980
 Rachel Alana Handler (born 1998), actress, singer and motivational speaker who is best known for playing Chunks in the 2016 horror movie Smothered
 Dennis Horner (born 1988), NBA basketball player who has played for the New Jersey Nets
 David B. Joslin (born 1936), bishop of the Episcopal Diocese of Central New York from 1992 to 2000
 Kenneth Lacovara (born 1961), paleontologist best known for his discovery of Dreadnoughtus.
 Sonia Manzano (born 1950), actress, screenwriter and author, best known for playing the character Maria Rodriguez on the PBS television show Sesame Street between 1971 and 2015
 Samuel Ojserkis (born 1990), rower who competed in the men's eight event at the 2016 Summer Olympics
 Tyler Stockton, college football coach and former player who serves as the defensive coordinator and inside linebackers coach at Ball State University

References

External links

 Linwood City website
 Linwood Public Schools
 
 School Data for the Linwood Public Schools, National Center for Education Statistics
 Mainland Regional High School website
 The Current of Linwood

 
1889 establishments in New Jersey
Cities in Atlantic County, New Jersey
City form of New Jersey government
Populated places established in 1889